The Women's Patriotic Institute (Russian: Патриотический институт) was a girls' school in Saint Petersburg in Russia between 1822 and 1918. It was a charity school, founded by the Patriotic Society (Russia)'. Originally a charity school with the purpose of educating the orphan daughters of officers who died during the French invasion of Russia, it gradually developed into a fashionable girl school.

References
 Абросимова Б. А. О благотворительных организациях в России / А. Б. Абросимова // Советское государство и право. — 1992. — No. 1

Charities based in Russia
Social welfare charities
1822 establishments in the Russian Empire
1918 disestablishments in Russia
19th century in Saint Petersburg
Schools in Saint Petersburg
Educational institutions established in 1822
Girls' schools in Russia
Cultural heritage monuments of federal significance in Saint Petersburg